Balcanoona Airport (IATA:LCN, ICAO:YBLC) is a small airport running out of Balcanoona, South Australia.

Facilities 
There is one runway made of asphalt, with a heading of 05/23, and a length of 4199 ft (1280 m).

See also
List of airports in South Australia

References 

Airports in South Australia
Far North (South Australia)